Romi Mankin (born November 7, 1947) is an Estonian physicist known (see citation metrics below)  for his work in the field of stochastic processes. Currently he holds a post in Tallinn University as a Professor of Theoretical Physics. He is well published having published many articles in both the Proceedings of the Estonian Academy of Sciences and in the various sections of Physical Review (typically E but also D). and other major journals.

In 2002 he was awarded the Estonian Physical Society Annual Award. This was for his contribution to the development of stochastical physics in the area of noise-induced phase transitions and transfer phenomena.

References

Living people
1947 births
20th-century Estonian physicists
21st-century Estonian physicists